Parotocinclus aripuanensis is a species of catfish in the family Loricariidae. It is a freshwater species native to South America, where it occurs in the Aripuanã River basin, for which it is named. It is a very small fish that reaches 2.1 cm (0.8 inches) SL.

References 

Loricariidae
Fish described in 1988
Fauna of South America
Otothyrinae